The 2023 Texas Longhorns football team represents the University of Texas at Austin as a member of the Big 12 Conference during the 2023 NCAA Division I FBS football season. Led by third-year head coach Steve Sarkisian, the Longhorns play their home games at Darrell K Royal–Texas Memorial Stadium in Austin, Texas.

The season marks the team's last season as members of the Big 12 Conference before joining the Southeastern Conference on July 1, 2024.

Previous season
The Longhorns finished the 2022 season with a 8-5 record. Texas finished Big 12 Conference play at 6-3, a improvement from the 3–6 conference record the previous year. After becoming bowl eligible for the first time in two years, Texas faced off against Washington in the Alamo Bowl. In the Alamo Bowl, Washington defeated Texas 27-20.

Offseason

Departures

Team departures

Outgoing transfers

Note: Players with a dash in the new school column didn't land on a new team for the 2023 season.

Coaching staff departures

Acquisitions

Incoming transfers

2023 recruits

2023 overall class ranking

2024 Recruits

Walk-ons

Coaching staff additions

NFL Draft Combine

† Top performer

DNP = Did not participate

Returning starters
The Longhorns return 15 starters from the previous season. They return 7 on offense, 5 on defense, and 3 on special teams. 
Offense

Defense

Special teams

Spring Game

Sources:

Personnel

Coaching staff
Source: 

Source:

Roster
Source:

Roster outlook by postition

 - Redshirt
Bold – True Freshman

Schedule

Game summaries

vs. Rice

Sources:

at Alabama

Sources:

vs. Wyoming

Sources:

at Baylor

Sources:

vs. Kansas

Sources:

vs. Oklahoma

Sources:

at Houston

Sources:

vs. BYU

Sources:

vs. Kansas State

Sources:

at TCU

Sources:

at Iowa State

Sources:

vs. Texas Tech

Sources:

Statistics

Individual statistics

Defense

Key: POS: Position, SOLO: Solo Tackles, AST: Assisted Tackles, TOT: Total Tackles, TFL: Tackles-for-loss, SACK: Quarterback Sacks, INT: Interceptions, BU: Passes Broken Up, PD: Passes Defended, QBH: Quarterback Hits, FR: Fumbles Recovered, FF: Forced Fumbles, BLK: Kicks or Punts Blocked, SAF: Safeties, TD : Touchdown

Special teams

TV ratings

All totals via Sports Media Watch. Streaming numbers not included. † - Data not available.

Rankings

References

Texas
Texas Longhorns football seasons
Texas Longhorns football